Feyziyya School is an old school in Iran that was founded in the Safavid era. The school has been listed as one of Iran's national monuments as of January 29, 2008. The school served as a focal point for clerical opposition to Mohammad Reza Shah Pahlavi's White Revolution. In 1963 on Ashura, Ayatollah Ruhollah Khomeini delivered a speech at the school denouncing the Shah, and was arrested as a result.

Background 
The Feyziyya school was founded in Qom during the Safavid era. An epigraph on the south veranda dates its construction to the reign of Shah Tahmasp.
A school by the name of Astana existed at the site,  from the 6th century until the 11th. Reconstruction was carried out under the Safavids and the school was renamed Feyziyya. 
The school was rebuilt and extended under Fath-Ali Shah in 1792.  The school has 40 rooms on the first floor, 4 long veranda, 12 stalls and a square pool.

History

Opposition to the White Revolution 
In 1963 Mohammad Reza Shah announced a program of reform he labeled the White Revolution. Members of the Iranian clergy were angered by proposed land reforms and protested against these changes. The Shah himself traveled to Qom and announced the clergy black reactionaries worse than the red reactionaries and a hundred times more treacherous than the (communist) tudeh party during his speech. On 26 January 1963, he held a referendum to get the appearance of public support in which 5.6 million against 4.1 people vote for the reformation. The referendum was a good excuse for the government to take tougher practical action against the clergy and on 22 March 1963, coinciding with the death day of Ja'far al-Sadiq, the Shah's guards attacked Feyziyeh School and kill students and people. According to Daniel Brumberg, the regime persuaded the thugs to attack the students of Feyziyeh School.
In response Ayatollah Ruhollah Khomeini announced the new year of 1963 as a day of public mourning.

Khomeini's sermon 
On the afternoon of June 3, 1963, Ashura, Khomeini delivered a speech at the Feyziyeh school in which he denounced the Shah as a "wretched, miserable man", and warned him that if he did not change his ways the day would come when the people would offer up thanks for his departure from the country. His speech was heavily attended, to the extent that all of Feyziyeh's and Daralshafa’s courtyard, the courtyard of the shrine of Fatimah al-Ma‘sumah, the Astana square and the surrounding were full of people.
On 5 June 1963 at 3 am, two days later, police and commandos entered Khomeini's home in Qom and arrested him. They hurriedly transferred him to the Qasr Prison in Tehran. These events triggered the Movement of 15 Khordad.

Registration in the National Monument 
The Feyziyya school was registered as one of Iran's national monuments on January 29, 2008.

See also
Fatima Masumeh Shrine
Jamkaran
Tasua and Ashura

References

Buildings and structures in Qom
Safavid architecture
Schools in Iran
Education in Qom Province
National works of Iran